109–115 Wood Street (also known as Hartje Bros. Paper Manufacturing Co. or the Pittsburgh Ballet Theater Building) are two buildings located in Downtown Pittsburgh, Pennsylvania.

Description and history 
109–111 was built in 1897, and 113–115 was built in 1902, and both buildings were designed by American architect was Charles Bickel.

The buildings were added to the List of Pittsburgh History and Landmarks Foundation Historic Landmarks in 1975, and added to the National Register of Historic Places on April 4, 1996.

References

Commercial buildings completed in 1897
Commercial buildings completed in 1902
Commercial buildings on the National Register of Historic Places in Pennsylvania
Pittsburgh History & Landmarks Foundation Historic Landmarks
National Register of Historic Places in Pittsburgh